Marni von Wilpert is an American attorney and politician serving as a member of the San Diego City Council representing the 5th district. She assumed office on December 10, 2020, succeeding Mark Kersey.

Early life and education 
Marni von Wilpert was raised in the Scripps Ranch neighborhood of San Diego. After graduating from Scripps Ranch High School in 2001, she earned a Bachelor of Arts degree in peace and conflict studies from the University of California, Berkeley. She then earned a Juris Doctor from the Fordham University School of Law.

Career 
After receiving her degree from the University of California, Berkeley, von Wilpert served as a Peace Corps volunteer in Botswana during the height of the HIV/AIDS epidemic in Africa. After graduating from law school, von Wilpert founded a legal clinic associated with the Mississippi Center for Justice. Additionally, von Wilpert served as a law clerk for James E. Graves Jr. and worked as an attorney for the National Labor Relations Board. She was also a detail staffer on the United States House Committee on Education and Labor and served as an advisor to committee chair Congressman Bobby Scott. In 2017, von Wilpert joined the Economic Policy Institute as Associate Labor Counsel. Since 2018, she has served as Deputy City Attorney in the San Diego City Attorney's Office.

In the 2020 election for the San Diego City Council, von Wilpert placed first in the nonpartisan blanket primary and defeated Joe Leventhal in the November general election. She assumed office on December 10, 2020.

In December 2020, she was appointed to serve on the San Diego County Regional Airport Authority board of directors.

References 

Living people
Politicians from San Diego
Lawyers from San Diego
Scripps Ranch High School alumni
University of California, Berkeley alumni
Fordham University School of Law alumni
California Democrats
1980s births
San Diego City Council members
21st-century American politicians
21st-century American women politicians
Women city councillors in California
21st-century American women lawyers
21st-century American lawyers